Jerez Industrial Club de Fútbol is a Spanish football team based in Jerez de la Frontera, Cádiz, in the autonomous community of Andalusia. Founded in 1951, it currently plays in División de Honor – Group 1, holding home matches at Estadio La Juventud, with a capacity of 5,000 seats.  

In summer 2010, Jerez were at risk of bankruptcy, but were saved when they signed a five-year deal with the Glenn Hoddle Academy. Later, the academy left the project and continued with local management.

History
Jerez Industrial was founded in 1951, reaching the national divisions six years later. The first league match played by the club was on 6 January 1952, against Andalusia neighbours Cádiz CF, a 1–2 defeat; Jerez finished the season in third place. In 1958, the first competitive derby match was played against Xerez CD, with a strong rivalry eventually arising between the two local clubs in the 1960s and 1970s, as they played in the same division for many years.

Jerez achieved promotion to Segunda División in 1968, but were immediately relegated back after ranking last in the league. Another relegation put the team in the regional leagues for the first time since 1957, with the new spell lasting five seasons.

In the 2008–09 season, Jerez promoted to Segunda División B – the new third level created in 1977 – but, the following year, the team found itself struggling in the league fighting relegation, with the club suffering from financial problems and the players owed wages. Subsequently, a loan of around £160,000 was paid by the Glenn Hoddle Academy (founded by former Tottenham Hotspur and England star Glenn Hoddle) so that the club could pay off debts and continue trading.

Eight players from the academy joined on loan in the second half of the season, but it was not enough to help Jerez avoid relegation back into the fourth level. Subsequently, a five-year deal was signed in the 2010 summer saving the club from bankruptcy, and Hoddle assumed control of all football operations. The side kept a Spanish coach and assistant, with Nigel Spackman, Graham Rix and Dave Beasant taking turns on the touchline and rotating on the bench for two matches at a time.

The Glenn Hoddle Academy terminated its agreement with Jerez Industrial in March 2011, and its players returned to United Kingdom, leaving the club with only their youth team to play their fixtures. The academy later agreed for twelve of its players to continue playing for the club until the end of the Tercera División season. Following the end of this deal the club continued to struggle financially, and were relegated two divisions to the Regional Preferente de Andalucía.

Season to season

1 season in Segunda División
1 season in Segunda División B
41 seasons in Tercera División

References

External links
Official website 
Lapreferente profile 

Football clubs in Andalusia
Association football clubs established in 1951
Sport in Jerez de la Frontera
Divisiones Regionales de Fútbol clubs
1951 establishments in Spain
Segunda División clubs